Clyde M. Becker (May 23, 1882 – July 19, 1938) was a geologist, an American football player and coach. He served as a player-coach at Oklahoma Baptist University in Shawnee, Oklahoma in 1911.

References

1882 births
1938 deaths
20th-century American geologists
Player-coaches
Oklahoma Baptist Bison football coaches
Oklahoma Baptist Bison football players
People from Fayette County, Iowa
Players of American football from Iowa